This is a list of current ambassadors to Iceland.

Current ambassadors

See also
Ambassadors of Iceland

References

 
Main
Iceland